Events from the year of 1436 in Ireland.

Incumbent
Lord: Henry VI

Events

Births

Deaths
 Cormac Ó Domhnalláin

References